Julius Lederer may refer to:
 Julius Lederer (entomologist) (1821–1870), Austrian entomologist
 Julius Lederer (businessman) (1917–1999), co-founder of Budget Rent a Car